Hakanlar Çarpışıyor (Khans Are Fighting) is a Turkish historic action film by Natuk Baytan. It was released in 1977, during the most popular days of the Turkish historic films. The film is about the life of a Turkic warrior named Olcayto, portrayed by Cüneyt Arkın, who is the son of a Kyrgyz chief in Central Asia. When he was a small boy, Chinese troops attack their tribe and kill Olcayto's father. After this event, he decides to take revenge from Chinese warlords. Later, he would find a chance to do so when Chinese form an alliance with a Sheikh from South Asia, who uses all his efforts to kill Olcayto because of the love affair between his daughter and Olcayto.

One of the main motives of the film is the "Bozkır Yasası" (Law of the Steppe). During many key scenes of the film, characters act according to this notion which praises the success of a warrior. This also gives the film a nationalistic flavour which can be considered as an "essential" point of the genre.

Writer Erdoğan Tünaş possibly got his inspiration from Karaoğlan, the popular character of Suat Yalaz. Both Olcayto and Karaoğlan are from Central Asia, they are talented warriors, they have noble black horses and they both use swords which have grey wolf figures on their handles. Another important detail of the film is that Cüneyt Arkın's partner in it is Aytekin Akkaya, the same actor who also stars in the Turkish cult film Dünyayı Kurtaran Adam with Arkın.

Plot

Cast 
Cüneyt Arkın as Halit,Olcayto and Başbuğ Toluğ (triple role)
Bahar Erdeniz as Zeliha, Olcayto's wife
Aytekin Akkaya as Tegin Khan  
Hüseyin Peyda as Sheikh Malik  
Turgut Özatay as Tun-Kay  
Hikmet Taşdemir - Kabir
Reha Yurdakul - Celme Noyan  
Levent Çakır - Sungur  
Sönmez Yıkılmaz - Demirbilek El-Cerrah  
Arseven Gümüş - Khaan  
Süheyl Eğriboz - Kim-Yu  
Mehmet Uğur - Çinli  
Necdet Kökeş - Çakır  
Cemal Konca - Şen-Kin  
Muzaffer Cıvan - Moğol  
Arap Celal - Hancı  
Niyazi Er - Tağmaç Beyi  
Yılmaz Kurt - Çinli  
Kadir Kök - Çinli/Kara Sadi  
Hakkı Kıvanç - Sheikh Malik  
Ahmet Sert - Boğaç Usta  
Doğan Tamer 
Hamit Haskabal - Khan's henchman  
Asım Par - Çinli  
Yadigar Ejder - Cellat
Oktar Durukan - Yantar

See also
Cinema of Turkey

External links
 

1977 films
1970s action films
Films set in Turkey
1970s historical adventure films
Turkish historical adventure films
Historical action films
Turkish swashbuckler films
Films set in Asia
Films set in ancient India
Films set in Kyrgyzstan
Turkish films about revenge
Fictional Kyrgyzstani people